In geometry, the metabidiminished icosahedron is one of the Johnson solids. The name refers to one way of constructing it, by removing two pentagonal pyramids from a regular icosahedron, replacing two sets of five triangular faces of the icosahedron with two adjacent pentagonal faces. If two pentagonal pyramids are removed to form nonadjacent pentagonal faces, the result is instead the pentagonal antiprism.

External links
 

Johnson solids